"Wasted on the Way" is a 1982 song by American folk rock band Crosby, Stills & Nash, featuring harmony vocals by Timothy B. Schmit.  It was their first top 10 hit in five years, and peaked at #9 on the Billboard Hot 100 singles charts in August 1982.  On the Adult Contemporary chart, "Wasted on the Way" was the group's biggest hit on the chart, peaking at number two for five weeks. It appeared on the band's 1982 album Daylight Again. The B-side was the David Crosby composition "Delta".

Personnel 
 David Crosby — vocals
 Stephen Stills — vocals, guitars
 Graham Nash — vocals

Additional musicians
 Timothy B. Schmit — vocals
 Joel Bernstein — acoustic guitar
 Craig Doerge — keyboards
 Bob Glaub — bass
 Russ Kunkel — drums
 Joe Lala — percussion
 Wayne Goodwin — fiddle
 Michael Stergis — guitars

Charts

Weekly charts

Year-end charts

References

1982 singles
Crosby, Stills, Nash & Young songs
Songs written by Graham Nash
1982 songs
Atlantic Records singles